Bentley Common is a village in Warwickshire, England. For population details see Merevale.

External links

Villages in Warwickshire